Cosmopterix trilopha is a moth species of the  family Cosmopterigidae which was first described in 1922 by Edward Meyrick. Its type locality is in Uganda; the species is additionally known from Malawi, Kenya and Ethiopia.

References

trilopha
Moths described in 1922
Taxa named by Edward Meyrick
Moths of Africa